Hastier was the name of two ships operated by Lloyd Royal Belge.

, a passenger ship which caught fire in 1920 and was scrapped in 1922.
, a cargo ship which foundered in 1919 on her maiden voyage.

Ship names